Palazzo Moro Lin may refer to:

 Palazzo Moro Lin (San Marco), a 17th century Venetian palace in the San Marco sestiere
 Palazzo Moro Lin (San Polo), a 16th century Venetian palace in the San Polo sestiere